Hajjiabad-e Neyzaz (also Romanized as Ḩājjīābād-e Neyzāz; also known as Ḩājjīābād-e Neyzār, Ḩājīābād, Hājīābād, and Ḩājjīābād) is a village in Neyzar Rural District, Salafchegan District, Qom County, Qom Province, Iran. At the 2006 census, its population was 153, in 42 families.

References 

Populated places in Qom Province